The siege of Sadr City was a blockade of the Shi'a district of northeastern Baghdad carried out by U.S. and Iraqi government forces in an attempt to destroy the main power base of the insurgent Mahdi Army in Baghdad. The siege began on 4 April 2004 – later dubbed "Black Sunday" – with an uprising against the Coalition Provisional Authority following the government banning of a newspaper published by Muqtada Al-Sadr's Sadrist Movement. The most intense periods of fighting in Sadr City occurred during the first uprising in April 2004, the second in August the same year, during the sectarian conflict that gripped Baghdad in late 2006, during the Iraq War troop surge of 2007, and during the spring fighting of 2008.

Background

On March 28, the US leader of the Coalition Provisional Authority of Iraq, Paul Bremer, ordered the 60-day closure of Al-Hawza, a newspaper published by Muqtada al-Sadr's group, on the charges of inciting violence against the occupation. The next day thousands of Iraqis rallied outside the offices of Al-Hawza in support of the newspaper.

On April 3, Bremer sent troops to al-Sadr's home and arrested Mustafa Yaqoubi, a top lieutenant, sparking further protests.

On April 4, al-Sadr issued a statement calling on his supporters to stop staging demonstrations “because your enemy prefers terrorism”.

“America has unsheathed its fangs and its despicable intentions, and the conscientious Iraqi people cannot remain silent at all. They must defend their rights in the ways they see fit,” the statement said, according to The Washington Post.

On the same day as this statement was given, the Mahdi Army began an uprising against the Coalition. The fighting spread across the south of Iraq, while in Baghdad the fighting was concentrated in the Shi'a areas of Baghdad, mainly Sadr City. This uprising occurred simultaneously with  an offensive launched by Sunni insurgents in western Iraq.

Siege

Beginning of the siege 

As the fighting started on April 4, 2004, militiamen ambushed a 1st Cavalry Division patrol and Iraqi police were expelled from three police stations in Sadr City. Members of the newly arrived 1st Cavalry Division and elements of the 2nd Armored Cavalry Regiment were sent out to retake them. Eight US troops were killed and 51 more wounded in the bloody battle. US forces, from the 759th Military Police Battalion, subsequently regained control of the police stations after running firefights with Mahdi rebels that killed 35 Mahdi Army militiamen; over 500 were reported killed by the Iraqi Ministry of Health. Mahdi Army members still maintained control over many of the slum areas of Sadr City.

On May 15, 2004, six soldiers from the New Jersey National Guard, assigned to the 759th MP BN, as C, 759th MP BN, and operationally controlled by the 1st Cavalry Division, were pinned down by enemy fire. Their patrol element was equipped with two HMMWV's, and were ambushed at Al-Karama Iraqi police station in Sadr City. The six soldiers defended the Iraqi police, who were not willing to fight, as well as their Station taking on small arms fire, and rocket propelled grenade attacks. The patrol's communications devices were blocked by surrounding buildings and were unable to call for support.

After several hours of engaging the enemy and defending in place, while surrounded by ambushing enemy elements, their firefight was observed by aerial support elements, followed by an armored vehicle patrol who assisted in their egress out of the Iraqi Police Station and the city. Reports later indicated that the coordinated enemy attack from the Mahdi Army consisted of over 100 militia, and the six US soldiers eliminated an estimated 19 insurgents while enduring no casualties to their team, or the Iraqi police who refused to assist in the engagement. After the egress of the US Army element, the Iraqi police station was completely destroyed.

The US Army did not set up a blockade around Sadr City and did not have military checkpoints around the slum. The task of destroying the Mahdi Army in the district was not an easy one for the Coalition for two reasons. First was the fear of mass civilian casualties if there was a direct attack because of the large number of people living in Sadr City. Second, the narrow streets in the district made US armored vehicle movement difficult because of their size. Despite this, the 1st Cavalry Division consistently retained freedom of movement in Sadr City, conducting multiple patrols every day and night. In Sadr City itself Mahdi Army militiamen coordinated a system of security that ran parallel to the official police structure, but this soon crumbled as they suffered heavy casualties in the uprising.

In the coming months, Sadr City was under near-constant combat that was occasionally lifted following agreements by the Mahdi Army to end the fighting. These temporary ceasefires would be called off because of repeated violations of the agreements. The Mahdi Army occasionally shelled the Green Zone, the central seat of Coalition power in Iraq, with mortars and rockets from the district. These attacks stopped when US Army attack helicopters destroyed a rocket team and US Army artillery annihilated a mortar team. The rocket attacks came back after a year and grew both in number and sophistication due to the training of the Mahdi Army.

Militiamen also conducted raids against Coalition forces outside Sadr City in other parts of Baghdad, like on June 4, when a Mahdi Army ambush on a US National Guard patrol on Palestine Street, near Sadr City, left five US soldiers dead. Occasional heavy street fighting occurred. One such battle took place on September 7, when one US soldier and 40 Iraqis were killed and another 270 people wounded during street battles on the outskirts of the district. Three other US soldiers were killed in a string of attacks across the capital that day.

Sectarian killings
In late 2006 Baghdad was more than 80 percent under the control of insurgent forces and so an intense sectarian turf war broke out between Sunni and Shia insurgents, including the Mahdi Army.

Sadr City was spared from most of the massacres that were leaving 50, 60 or 70 bodies throughout Baghdad per day because of the blockade and the tight Mahdi Army control of the district. However, al-Qaeda elements did conduct suicide and car bomb attacks in the district against Shias. One of the deadliest attacks was a series of car bombs and mortar attacks in Sadr City on November 23, 2006, that began at 15:10 and ended at 15:55, which left at least 215 civilians dead and some 257 wounded. Six car bombs and two mortar rounds were used in the attack on the Shi'ite Muslim slum. 3 days later, on 26 November 2006, 3 more US Army soldiers were killed by an IED right outside Sadr City. Included in those killed were PFC Joshua C Burrows E Co 1-8 Cavalry, 1st Cavalry Division and 2 officers.

During the spring and summer of 2007 the British SAS as part of Task Force Knight suffered several men seriously wounded as it extended its operations into Sadr City.

Operation Imposing Law and the August 2007 cease-fire
In February 2007, the Coalition launched Operation Imposing Law with the sole purpose of taking back Baghdad from the insurgents. Heavy street battles, block by block, neighborhood by neighborhood, ensued for the next six months. There were several skirmishes on the outskirts of Sadr City but the Coalition left that part of the capital to be taken last.

By late November the operation ended with southern portions of Baghdad still remaining in al-Qaeda hands and the whole of Sadr City still under Mahdi Army control.

In late August heavy fighting erupted in Karbala between the Mahdi Army and policemen who were members of the rival Supreme Islamic Iraqi Council. More than 50 people were killed. After that Sadr declared a unilateral cease-fire to be implemented by all branches and elements of the Mahdi Army.

The cease-fire was observed by most of the Mahdi Army, but the Coalition forces still continued to harass the Mahdi Army with constant raids. The Coalition stated they were only targeting rogue elements of the militia. However, during this time a complete reorganisation of the Mahdi Army was conducted and almost all of the criminal and rogue elements of the militia were eliminated by Sadr. But despite this Coalition raids continued into March 2008.

March 2008 fighting

On March 25, an Iraqi military assault was launched against the port city of Basra, which was held by a number of militia groups, but primarily by the Mahdi Army. This led to the collapse of the cease-fire and the continuation of the fighting in Sadr City. Beginning early in the morning of March 25, Mahdi Army militia launched a number of rocket and mortar attacks from Sadr City at US forward operating bases throughout Baghdad, as well as the Green Zone.

On March 28, the Iraqi prime minister, Nouri al Maliki, clamped an around-the-clock curfew on Baghdad after fighting spread from Basra into the capital.

During the fighting on the evening of March 28, reports came in that a unit of 500 policemen decided to stop working with the government and join the Mahdi Army. The next morning, in a well-publicized event in Sadr City, 40 men who said they were Iraqi police officers surrendered their weapons to Sadr officials saying "We can't fight our brothers in the Mahdi Army, so we came here to submit our weapons." In return, the Sadr officials gave the officers olive branches and Korans. The weapons were returned after the officers pledged not to use them against Mahdi Army members. “These weapons are for defending the country but not for fighting your brothers,” said Sheik Salman al-Fraji, head of the Sadr office there. Another 15 soldiers also surrendered elsewhere in Baghdad.

During the heavy street fighting in Sadr City and its neighboring districts between March 23, 2008 and March 31, 2008, 180 militants and 150 civilians were killed. Nine U.S. soldiers were killed during the fighting along with a number of members from the Iraqi security forces. Two U.S. diplomats and two Iraqi policemen were killed in the shelling of the Green Zone during this period.

On March 31 the curfew announced by the Iraqi prime minister was lifted in most parts of  Baghdad following another unilateral ceasefire called by Muqtada al-Sadr. However the curfew remained in effect in Sadr City into April and the ceasefire only lasted until April 6, when US forces, for the first time, started a push into Sadr City, trying to hold the ground gained in an attempt to get the militia mortar teams further away from the Green Zone. The U.S. and Iraqi units were coming under heavy fire as they moved deeper into the neighborhood, engaging anyone that faced them.

2008 U.S. assault
On April 6, 2008, the Iraqi National Security Council released a statement calling on all political parties to disband their militias if they want to participate in the elections later in the year. The statement was seen to be directed at Muqtada al-Sadr, who derives most of his support from Sadr City.

On the same day, a joint U.S. and Iraqi military force (Iraqi elements drawn from the 11th Division) moved into the southern suburbs of Sadr City, provoking heavy street fighting as militiamen opened fire with RPGs and automatic weapons. Two Iraqi Army armored vehicles and two trucks were destroyed and one U.S. Stryker armored personnel carrier was damaged. U.S. Apache helicopters provided air support during the battle, launching Hellfire missiles at militiamen and their vehicles. The U.S. military reported nine militiamen were killed in one such air strike around 8 a.m. after militiamen attacked Iraqi troops with RPGs. The raid was a part of an attempt to stop mortar and rocket fire on the Green Zone by seizing neighborhoods in Sadr City used as launching points by the Mahdi Army, Rockets and mortar fire continued to fall on the Green Zone and U.S. military bases around the capital. Three US soldiers and at least 20 Iraqis had been killed by the end of the day. 31 U.S. soldiers were also wounded in the fighting.

Unmanned Predator aircraft fired Hellfire missiles into Sadr City every day targeting the mortar and rocket teams. The fighting mostly stopped early on April 11, as U.S. and Iraqi forces managed to advance down the main road through Sadr City and set up a forward defence line inside the district. However, that night fighting continued when U.S. and Iraqi units were attacked with small-arms, machine guns and RPGs from high-rise buildings in Sadr City. Snipers and roadside bombs were also used against a Coalition convoy transporting concrete barriers for use in constructing an Iraqi Army checkpoint. The U.S. military claimed it killed at least 13 Madhi Army militiamen in three separate engagements following the attacks on its forces.

On April 15, the 769th Engineer Battalion, protected by 1-68 Armor Battalion C company M1 Abrams tanks, Stryker APCs and Apache helicopters, began construction of a massive concrete barrier along Al Quds Street, a major road separating the southern districts of Thawra and Jamilla from the northern districts which make up the heart of Sadr City. The barrier was designed to turn the southern districts of Sadr city into a protected zone in which US and Iraqi forces could begin reconstruction.

Late in the evening of April 15, a company of Iraqi police deserted their positions at a police station  ahead of the coalition positions and the Mahdi army moved in to occupy the station. Although the company was a relatively green unit which had relieved a more experienced unit only days before, it raised doubts among US forces about the Iraqis' ability to hold their ground. An Iraqi special reconnaissance unit recaptured the police station the next day.

On April 17, a heavy dust storm engulfed Baghdad and the militiamen used this to their advantage, attacking the coalition front lines under the cover of the storm. Militiamen attacked an Iraqi police station which had American advisors embedded with the Iraqis, fearing a repeat of Tuesday's desertions. As fighting grew and US forces prepared to send tanks and APCs to support the Iraqis, an Iraqi armored force arrived at the station before US forces were needed. Fighting continued throughout the night and new attacks were staged the next day as the storm continued and U.S. forces were not able to send in helicopters, planes or drones to assist. This day another company of Iraqi soldiers deserted their post after almost being overrun by militants. The fighting finally died down in the evening as the sand storm lifted. In the fighting on April 17 and 18, 17 Iraqi soldiers and 22 militiamen were killed along with a number of civilians.

By April 18, Coalition forces managed to take a quarter of Sadr City, which was made up mostly of the southern outskirts of the slum. However, they were not able to move in any further. For the next week, US drones and helicopters continued to attack Mahdi Army forces launching mortars or placing roadside bombs. 

On April 27, the Mahdi Army once again took advantage of a heavy dust storm which grounded US aerial forces to attack the blockades around Sadr City. 22 Mahdi army militiamen were killed when they attacked a joint US-Iraqi checkpoint. The checkpoint was supported by M1A2 Abrams tanks and no US or Iraqi forces were injured during the attack. 16 militants were also killed in separate engagements throughout eastern Baghdad, according to a US military statement. The next day three American soldiers were killed by rocket and mortar attacks in eastern Baghdad. Another US soldier was killed in a similar attack in northern Baghdad. On the same day seven militants were killed by US tank and helicopter fire in Sadr city. In total four U.S. soldiers, 45 militants and eight civilians were killed during the 24 hours of fighting.

On April 29, U.S. forces in Stryker vehicles tried to push deeper into Sadr City but were met with stiff resistance from fighters using machine-guns and RPGs. After heavy fighting the troops withdrew to their start positions. 28 militants were killed, 6 U.S. soldiers were wounded, several U.S. military vehicles were damaged and three buildings used by militants were destroyed by American bombing during the battle. It brought to 79 the number of militiamen killed in the three days of fighting in Sadr city. Later in the evening one U.S. soldier was killed in the vicinity of Sadr City. Two other U.S. soldiers were also killed this day in fighting in other northern and northwestern parts of the capitol.

April 30 – May 1: The US military claimed to have killed 28 militiamen in a series of engagements beginning just before midday and lasting into the early morning of May 1. The largest  attack occurred around 11.20 a.m. when US forces building the concrete barrier were attacked with RPGs, automatic weapons and mortars. 10 militiamen were killed in the attack and no U.S. casualties were reported. Nine militiamen were killed while preparing to fire rockets at Coalition forces or after placing roadside bombs. Eight others were killed throughout the evening in a number of separate firefights with US forces. A US special forces unit killed a senior Special Groups leader during a raid in Sadr City, bringing the total number of militiamen killed during the day to 28.

The U.S. strike caused heavy damage to the hospital, destroying or damaging a dozen ambulances and wounding 28 civilians.

Over the next week, militiamen in Sadr City and the neighboring suburbs continued emplacing IEDs, firing rockets and attacking U.S. forces constructing the barrier along al-Quds street. However U.S. forces from the 2nd Stryker Cavalry Regiment, the 3rd Infantry Division, the 4th Infantry Division, the 10th Mountain Division and the 25th Infantry Division, supported by UAVs firing Hellfire missiles, Bradley APCs, M1 tanks and U.S. Special Forces, inflicted heavy casualties on the militiamen. The U.S. military claimed that between May 3 and May 9, it had killed at least 76 militiamen. The vast majority of militiamen killed were killed by infantrymen assigned to A and C Co 2/30th Infantry Regiment, units from the 10th Mountain Division staged at JSS Oubaidy and JSS Baladiat, respectively.

Iraqi Special Operations Forces (ISOF), supported by U.S. Army Special Forces, and U.S. Navy EOD, were also operating in Sadr City. On May 6, an ISOF unit captured seven "Special Groups" members allegedly responsible for supplying explosively formed penetrators (EFPs) into Baghdad, as well as firing rockets into the Green Zone. Between May 8 and May 9, U.S. Special Forces killed 13 Special Groups members  while providing security for U.S. engineers 821st Engineer company West Virginia National Guard.

On May 11, a cease-fire went into effect and on May 12 a 14-point agreement was signed between the Iraqi government and representatives of Muqtada al-Sadr, granting Iraqi military forces permission by the Mahdi Army to enter the district to establish security checkpoints and to hunt for rogue militiamen. Under the agreement, the U.S. military would not enter areas of Sadr City north of al-Quds street, but the Mahdi Army promised to stop rocket attacks on U.S. military bases and the Green Zone.

Just before dawn on May 20, six battalions of Iraqi soldiers moved into the northern districts of Sadr City as part of Operation Salaam ("Peace" in Arabic). The Iraqi forces met no resistance as they took up positions formerly occupied by the Madhi Army, and were generally welcomed by Sadr City residents. Militiamen from the Mahdi Army handed Iraqi soldiers copies of the Koran as a gesture of goodwill. Iraqi forces secured the Imam Ali and Sadr hospitals as well as setting up a checkpoint and positioning tanks outside al-Sadr's political office. In a press conference, General Qassem Atta said Iraqi forces had safely detonated 100 bombs since the incursion began.

At least 941 people were killed. Among the dead were 22 U.S. and 17 Iraqi soldiers as well as 331 militants and 591 civilians. 100 U.S. soldiers and more than 1,700 civilians were wounded. 549 of the civilians were killed in Sadr City while another 42 were killed in different parts of Baghdad by mortars, fired from Sadr City, which missed the Green Zone.

Aftermath
By May 21, 2008, Iraqi Army Units had secured or captured all of Sadr City, receiving little resistance as the 10,000 man force backed by tanks rolled past barricades and into the center of the city. However, Mahdi Army fighters remained in Sadr City, blended in the civilian population, with their weapons.

References

External links
Sudarsan Raghavan  – Under siege in Baghdad's Mahdi army stronghold – The Guardian
Michael R. Gordon – As Militias Roam Alleys, Iraqi Army Takes Brunt – The New York Times
Amit R. Paley – Attacks on Green Zone Drop Sharply, U.S. Says – Article in The Washington Post, including a map showing the location of the barrier being built along al-Quds street
Hala Jaber – Mahdi Army fighters grateful for sand storm standstills in Sadr City – Times Online
Michael R. Gordon Under Despite Truce, War Over Wall Persists in Sadr City – The New York Times
Michael R Gordon and Stephen Farrell Iraqi Troops Take Charge of Sadr City in Swift Push – The New York Times
Satellite map of Baghdad with district overlay. Sadr City is also known as Thawra district and is represented by districts 26,27 and 28 – UN Humanitarian Information Centers
Tom Vanden Brook – Drone attacks hit high in Iraq – Article in The Washington Post discussing the Coalition's increased reliance on unmanned aerial vehicles (UAVs) in Basra and Sadr City
How Technology Won Sadr City Battle – CBS
Sadr City After the Fall – Michael Totten
Gaza Ground Campaign Mirrors Battle of Sadr City – Wired.com
Bill Murray – Battle over Sadr City Defines Apache Helicopter Regiment's Tour in Iraq – FDD's Long War Journal

Battles of the Iraq War in 2004
Battles of the Iraq War in 2008
Battles of the Iraq War involving the United States
Battles of the Iraq War involving Iraq
Urban warfare
Sadr City